Diplodonta globus is a species of marine bivalve mollusc in the family Ungulinidae.

References
 Powell A. W. B., William Collins Publishers Ltd, Auckland 1979 

Ungulinidae
Bivalves of New Zealand
Bivalves described in 1835